John Hannam or Hammond (died 1559) was an English politician.

Hannam was an MP for Poole in 1547 and Melcombe Regis in November 1554.

References

Year of birth missing
1559 deaths
English MPs 1547–1552
English MPs 1554–1555